Howlin' Wolf is the second album from the Chicago blues singer/guitarist/harmonicist, Howlin' Wolf. It is a collection of twelve singles previously released by the Chess label from 1960 through 1962. Because of the illustration on its sleeve (by Don S. Bronstein), the album is often called The Rockin' Chair Album, a nickname even added to the cover on some reissue pressings of the LP.

Legacy and awards
In 1966, fellow Chess artist Koko Taylor recorded a cover version of "Wang Dang Doodle" which reached No. 4 on the Billboard's R&B Charts and became a minor crossover hit by making No. 58 on the Billboard Hot 100. Earlier in 1963, Sam Cooke released a single of "Little Red Rooster" making No. 7 on the R&B Singles chart and No. 11 on the Hot 100. 

In 1964, "Little Red Rooster" was released by the Rolling Stones and became the first and only time that a blues record reached No. 1 in the UK Singles Chart (see Little Red Rooster#Rolling Stones version). In 1966, Cream recorded "Spoonful" on their debut album Fresh Cream and included a live, 17-minute version on their 1968 album Wheels of Fire. In 1969 the songs "Shake for Me" and "Back Door Man" were used in the lyrics to the Led Zeppelin song "Whole Lotta Love."

In 1985, the album won a Blues Music Award by The Blues Foundation for 'Classics of Blues Recordings—Album'. In 2012, the album was ranked No. 238 on Rolling Stone magazine's list of the 500 greatest albums of all time and described as "an outrageous set of sex songs written by Willie Dixon." It was named the third greatest guitar album of all time by Mojo magazine in 2004.

Reissue
In 1984, this album was reissued by Chess as CH-9183. The cover picture was changed slightly adding  an elliptical logo beneath the album title that reads "CHICAGO 26 Golden years Single Album" and the "Chess LP 1469" trademark was replaced with the "CH-9183" identifier.

Track listing
All tracks composed by Willie Dixon; except where indicated

Side one
 "Shake for Me" – 2:12
 "The Red Rooster" – 2:22
 "You'll Be Mine" – 2:25
 "Who's Been Talkin'" (Howlin' Wolf) – 2:18
 "Wang Dang Doodle" – 2:18
 "Little Baby" – 2:45

Side two
 "Spoonful" – 2:42
 "Going Down Slow" (St. Louis Jimmy Oden) – 3:18
 "Down in the Bottom" – 2:05
 "Back Door Man" – 2:45
 "Howlin' for My Darlin'" – 2:28 
 "Tell Me" (Howlin' Wolf) – 2:52

Personnel
Performers
 Howlin' Wolf – lead vocals, guitar, harmonica
 William Johnson – guitar
 Freddy Robinson – guitar
 Jimmy Rogers – guitar
 Otis "Big Smokey" Smothers – guitar
 Hubert Sumlin – guitar
 Jody Williams – guitar
 Henry Gray – piano
 Johnny Jones – piano
 Hosea Lee Kennard – piano
 Lafayette Leake – piano
 Otis Spann – piano
 Willie Dixon – bass, vocals on “Going Down Slow”
 Buddy Guy – bass
 Fred Below – drums
 Junior Blackman – drums
 Sam Lay – drums
 S.P. Leary – drums
 Sammy Lewis – drums
 Earl Phillips – drums
 J. T. Brown – saxophone
 Donald Hankins – baritone saxophone
 Arnold Rogers – tenor saxophone

Production
 Ralph Bass – producer, sleeve notes
 Ron Malo – engineer
 Don S. Bronstein – cover art, photography

References

1962 compilation albums
Howlin' Wolf albums
Chess Records compilation albums
Albums produced by Ralph Bass